Maximus was Bishop of Pavia. He was in attendance at councils of Rome convened under Pope Symmachus.

References

511 deaths
Italian Roman Catholic saints
6th-century Italian bishops
Bishops of Pavia
Year of birth unknown